The John W. White House is a historic house at 1509 West Main Street in Russellville, Arkansas.  It is a broad two-story brick structure, in a broad expression of the American Foursquare style with Prairie School and Craftsman elements.  It is covered by a hipped tile roof, with a hipped dormer on the front roof face.  A single-story hip-roof porch extends across the front, supported by rustic stone piers and balustrade.  The house was built in 1916 for a wealthy banker and businessman, and is one of the finest high-style houses in the city.

The house was listed on the National Register of Historic Places in 1988.

See also
National Register of Historic Places listings in Pope County, Arkansas

References

Houses on the National Register of Historic Places in Arkansas
National Register of Historic Places in Pope County, Arkansas
Prairie School architecture
Houses completed in 1916
Houses in Pope County, Arkansas
Buildings and structures in Russellville, Arkansas
Historic districts on the National Register of Historic Places in Arkansas
Foursquare architecture in the United States
American Craftsman architecture in Arkansas
1916 establishments in Arkansas